Lalao Ravaonirina (born 8 November 1963) is a retired Malagasy athlete who specialized in the 100 and 200 metres. She competed in the women's 100 metres at the 1992 Summer Olympics.

Her personal best time was 11.32 seconds, achieved in July 1991 in Limoges. This is the current Malagasy record, held jointly with Hanitriniaina Rakotondrabe.

Achievements 
1997 Jeux de la Francophonie - bronze medal (100 m)
1994 Jeux de la Francophonie - bronze medal (100 m)
1989 Jeux de la Francophonie - bronze medal (100 m), silver medal (200 m)
1989 African Championships - bronze medal (200 m)
1988 African Championships - bronze medal (100 m)

References

External links

1963 births
Living people
Malagasy female sprinters
Athletes (track and field) at the 1992 Summer Olympics
Athletes (track and field) at the 1996 Summer Olympics
Olympic athletes of Madagascar
Olympic female sprinters